Nohra is a village and a former municipality in the Weimarer Land district of Thuringia, Germany. Since December 2019, it is part of the municipality Grammetal. On 1 December 2007, the former municipality Utzberg was incorporated by Nohra.

Nohra was the location of the first Nazi concentration camp, established on March 3, 1933.  Prisoners were incarcerated in a school building.

The former Luftwaffe airbase at Nohra was used by the Soviet Army for helicopter operations from 1945 until their withdrawal in 1992. The airfield had a short runway, a hangar and a radio beacon. Subsequently, the department for regional development largely demolished the complex, but a few elements were preserved because of their historic value, including a large stone statue of Lenin which was restored.

References

Weimarer Land
Grand Duchy of Saxe-Weimar-Eisenach
Former municipalities in Thuringia